Brayne is a surname. Notable people with the surname include:

 Carol Brayne, British academic
 Frank Lugard Brayne (1882–1952), administrator in Punjab Province, British India
 John Brayne (c. 1541–1586), English entrepreneur
 Mark Brayne (born 1950), English psychotherapist and journalist

See also
 Brain (surname)